Elections to Liverpool City Council were held on 3 May 2012, on the same day as other 2012 United Kingdom local elections, in addition to electing a mayor for the region.

Councillors who were elected in the 2008 Liverpool Council election defended their seats in 2012 and the vote share comparisons have been worked out on this basis.

Election result in 2012

Ward Results

Allerton & Hunt Cross

Anfield

Belle Vale

Central

Childwall

Church

Clubmoor

County

Cressington

Croxteth

Everton

Fazakerley

Greenbank

Kensington & Fairfield

Kirkdale

Knotty Ash

Mossley Hill

Norris Green

Old Swan

Picton

Princes Park

Riverside

St. Michael's

Speke-Garston

Tuebrook & Stoneycroft

Warbreck

Wavertree

West Derby

Woolton

Yew Tree

By-Elections

Allerton and Hunts Cross, 5 July 2012

Caused by the death of Councillor Vera Best (Liberal Democrat, elected 6 May 2010)

Riverside, 5 July 2012

Caused by the resignation of Joe Anderson on his being elected as Mayor of Liverpool.

Knotty Ash, 15 November 2012

Caused by the resignation of Jacqui Nasuh (Labour, elected 6 May 2010).

Riverside, 5 December 2013

Caused by the resignation of Paul Brant ( Labour, elected 5 May 2011).

References

2012
2012 English local elections
2010s in Liverpool